D-topia Entertainment (previously known as DTJ or D-Topia Japan) is a Japanese record label produced by Terukado Ōnishi, officially established in public prior to December 14, 2007. The label is dedicated to promoting girls' entertainment, particularly the music of female singers. It was formed as a business partnership between Avex Group, its co-area promoter, and Victor Entertainment, its distributing label.

On September 9, 2010, D-topia announced that they had paired with Universal Music Japan to create a new label, D-Topia Universe, with distribution by Universal Music Japan. The label's first release was Aira Mitsuki's third full-length album, "???", released on November 17, 2010.

Musical style

Originally the home of rock-pop idol group Harenchi Punch, the main focus of D-topia was originally very idol-centric. Towards 2009, the focus of the label gradually shifted to electronica acts starting with Mega Trance audition winner Aira Mitsuki.

In 2010, D-topia's musical styles changed again, with the newcomer group KOR=GIRL performing in a sound incorporating alternative rock and electronica. Formerly an Akihabara-style technopop idol, Saori@destiny released the more experimental album "WORLD WILD 2010", which received some attention from critics for its mix of electronic dance music styles such as funk carioca and funkot, many of which had never been attempted in Japan before.

In 2012, the label added the idol group Happy Super Generation to its lineup of artists, who became ICT Lovelies!! in 2013.

In November 2017, the company rebranded as "Star, Inc." after a number of artist in the label filed a lawsuit.

Current acts

 Ready Candy Camp
 Mariane Takanashi

Former acts
 80_pan (previously Harenchi Punch & 80★PAN!) (now disbanded)
 Saya Ozora (formerly of 80★PAN!) (graduated)
 Aira Mitsuki (August 2007; March 2008 - Major Debut)
 Kaze (August 2011)
 Minamelo (August 2011)
 Saori@destiny (December 2007; March 2008 - Major Debut)
 Miyabi Chinatsu (graduated) 
 Suzuoto Hikari (graduated)
 The Sakura Telephone (project group)
 Yui
 Sayu
 Rako 
 Rikaco
 KOR=GIRL 
 Happy Super Generation
 ICT Lovelies!! (formerly Happy Super Generation)

Releases

Albums

The following albums listed below are distributed by Victor Entertainment.

The following albums are released under D-Topia Universe and is distributed by Universal Music Japan.

References

External links
  
  
   (as Star, Inc.)

Japanese record labels
Avex Group
Universal Music Japan
Victor Entertainment
Labels distributed by Universal Music Group